Hans Ignaz Halberstadt (10 June 1885 – 22 September 1966) was a German-born American Olympic 
épée and saber fencer.

Early and personal life
Halberstadt was born and raised in Offenbach am Main, Germany, and was Jewish. He was trained at the Offenbach am Main Fechtclub.

Fencing career
Halberstadt was German National Champion in epee in 1922 and 1930. He was also German team sabre champion with Fechtclub Offenbach in 1924 and 1925.

He competed for Germany in the individual and team épée and team sabre (coming in fourth) events at the 1928 Summer Olympics in Amsterdam at the age of 42.

After the Nazis came to power, after Kristallnacht his family's business was seized by the Nazis and Halberstadt was interred in Bergen-Belsen concentration camp by the Nazis because he was Jewish. He then fled Germany at the age of 56 with what he could carry, first to London, and then San Francisco in 1940.

Halberstadt then became 1940 US Sabre Champion, both in individual saber and team saber.

In San Francisco he taught fencing in the 1940s at the San Francisco Olympic Club and then at his own club which he opened, and ran a fencing supply company. Among his students in San Francisco were Helene Mayer and Tommy Angell. His name lives on through a San Francisco fencing club founded by his students after his 1966 death.

Halberstadt was inducted into the U.S. Fencing Hall of Fame, in its Class of 2013.

References

External links
 

1885 births
1966 deaths
German male fencers
Olympic fencers of Germany
Fencers at the 1928 Summer Olympics
Sportspeople from Offenbach am Main
German emigrants to the United Kingdom
German emigrants to the United States
Jewish emigrants from Nazi Germany to the United States
German people of Jewish descent
Jewish male épée fencers
Jewish male sabre fencers
Jewish American sportspeople
Jewish German sportspeople
Fencers from San Francisco
Bergen-Belsen concentration camp survivors